Anatoly Mikhaylovich Nemtyryov (Russian: Анатолий Михайлович Немтырёв, born 24 December 1946) is a Soviet rower.

Nemtyryov was born in Patrikeyevo, Moscow, in 1946. He competed at the 1968 Summer Olympics with the coxed four, where the team came sixth. He won a gold medal at the 1973 European Rowing Championships in Moscow with the coxed four. He competed at the 1976 Summer Olympics with the men's eight, where the team came seventh. He won a gold medal at the 1978 World Rowing Championships in Cambridge, New Zealand with the coxless four.

References

1946 births
Living people
Soviet male rowers
World Rowing Championships medalists for the Soviet Union
Olympic rowers of the Soviet Union
Rowers at the 1968 Summer Olympics
Rowers at the 1976 Summer Olympics
European Rowing Championships medalists